Davidson da Luz Pereira (born 5 March 1991) is a Brazilian footballer who plays as a winger for Chinese Super League club Wuhan Three Towns.

Career

In 2018, he signed for Vitória Guimarães.

Career Statistics
.

References

1991 births
Living people
Brazilian footballers
Brazilian expatriate footballers
Primeira Liga players
Süper Lig players
Chinese Super League players
Clube Atlético do Porto players
Galícia Esporte Clube players
Fortaleza Esporte Clube players
S.C. Covilhã players
G.D. Chaves players
Vitória S.C. players
Alanyaspor footballers
Wuhan Three Towns F.C. players
Expatriate footballers in Turkey
Brazilian expatriate sportspeople in Turkey
Expatriate footballers in Portugal
Brazilian expatriate sportspeople in Portugal
Expatriate footballers in China
Brazilian expatriate sportspeople in China
Association football wingers
People from Duque de Caxias, Rio de Janeiro
Sportspeople from Rio de Janeiro (state)